is the younger brother and heir presumptive of Emperor Naruhito of Japan and the younger son of Emperor Emeritus Akihito and Empress Emerita Michiko. Since his marriage in June 1990, he has had the title  and has headed his own branch of the imperial family.

Fumihito has a bachelor's degree in political science from Gakushuin University and a PhD in ornithology from the Graduate University for Advanced Studies. In 1990, he married Kiko Kawashima, with whom he has three children: Mako, Kako, and Hisahito. In November 2020, Fumihito was officially declared heir presumptive to the throne, during the Ceremony for Proclamation of Crown Prince (Rikkōshi-Senmei-no-gi) in Tokyo. Preceding his investiture as Crown Prince, the ongoing Japanese imperial succession debate had resulted in some politicians holding a favorable view on rescinding agnatic primogeniture imposed by World War II allies on the constitution of Japan. However, once Fumihito and Kiko had their son Hisahito in September 2006 he became next in the line of succession following his father. Fumihito's niece and Emperor Naruhito's only child Princess Aiko remains at present legally ineligible to inherit the throne, while debate about the possibility of having future empresses regnant continues.

As active working members of the imperial family, Fumihito and his wife Kiko's schedule includes attending summits, and organizational and global event meetings. The couple has particularly represented the Japanese imperial house in ceremonies involving heads of state and VIPs abroad.

Early life and education
The prince was born on 30 November 1965 in the morning at 12:22 am in the Imperial Household Agency Hospital, Tokyo Imperial Palace in Tokyo. His given name is Fumihito. His mother, Empress Emerita Michiko, is a convert to Shinto from Roman Catholicism. His childhood appellation was Prince Aya (礼宮 Aya-no-miya). He attended the primary and secondary schools of the Gakushūin. He played tennis in primary and secondary schools of the Gakushūin.

In April 1984, the prince entered the Law Department of Gakushuin University, where he studied law and biological science. After graduating from the university with a Bachelor's degree in Political Science, he studied the taxonomy of fish at St John's College, Oxford in the United Kingdom from October 1988 to June 1990. According to British government documents released by the National Archives, Fumihito's requests to follow in his elder brother's footsteps and study in Britain were initially turned down by the Imperial Household Agency.

Upon the death of his grandfather, Emperor Shōwa (Hirohito), on 7 January 1989, the prince became second-in-line to the throne after his elder brother, Crown Prince Naruhito.

The prince received a PhD degree in ornithology from the Graduate University for Advanced Studies in October 1996. His doctoral dissertation was titled, "Molecular Phylogeny of Jungle Fowls, genus Gallus and Monophyletic Origin of Domestic Fowls". He conducted field research in Indonesia in 1993 and 1994, and in Yunnan Province in the People's Republic of China. When the Emperor Emeritus was then Crown Prince, he introduced tilapia to Thailand as an important source of protein. Tilapia can be easily cultured and Prince Fumihito, who is also known as a "catfish specialist," has managed to maintain and expand the aquacultural studies with the people of Thailand. The prince has worked as a researcher at The University Museum of The University of Tokyo where he also is an Honorary Fellow.

Prior to Fumihito's birth, the announcement about the then-Crown Prince Akihito's engagement and marriage to the then-Ms. Michiko Shōda had drawn opposition from traditionalist groups, because Shōda came from a Roman Catholic family. Although Shōda was never baptized, she was educated in Catholic schools and seemed to share the faith of her parents. Rumors also speculated that Empress Kōjun had opposed the engagement. After the death of Fumihito's paternal grandmother Empress Kōjun in 2000, Reuters reported that she was one of the strongest opponents of her son's marriage, and that in the 1960s, she had driven her daughter-in-law and grandchildren to depression by persistently accusing her of not being suitable for her son.

Marriage and issue

On 29 June 1990, Fumihito married Kiko Kawashima, the daughter of Tatsuhiko Kawashima (professor of economics at Gakushuin University) and his wife, Kazuyo.

The couple met when they were both undergraduates at Gakushuin University. Like his father, the emperor emeritus, the prince married outside the former aristocracy and former collateral branches of the imperial family. Upon marriage, he received the title Prince Akishino (Akishino-no-miya – strictly "Prince Akishino") and authorization from the Imperial Household Economy Council to form a new branch of the Imperial Family. The marriage was bitterly resented by officials at the Imperial Household Agency, who had desired that the Prince adhere to tradition and not get married before his elder brother.

Children
Crown Prince and Crown Princess Akishino have two daughters and one son:
 ; formerly ; following her civil marriage to Kei Komuro on 26 October 2021, Mako gave up her imperial title and left the Imperial Family as required by 1947 Imperial Household Law.

Functions
Fumihito serves as the president of the Yamashina Institute for Ornithology and the Japanese Association of Zoological Gardens and Aquariums. He is also the honorary president of the World Wide Fund for Nature Japan, the Japan Tennis Association, and the Japan-Netherlands Association.

The prince and princess have made numerous official visits to foreign countries. In June 2002, they became the first members of the Imperial Family to visit Mongolia, in celebration of the 30th anniversary of diplomatic relations. In October 2002, they visited the Netherlands to attend the funeral of Prince Claus of the Netherlands. In September 2003, they made goodwill visits to Fiji, Tonga and Samoa, again, the first time ever members of the Imperial Family had visited these countries. In March 2004, the prince and princess returned to the Netherlands for the funeral of Queen Juliana of the Netherlands. In January 2005, they visited Luxembourg to attend the funeral of Grand Duchess Joséphine-Charlotte. From October to November 2006, they visited Paraguay to commemorate the 70th anniversary of Japanese emigration to that country. In January 2008, they visited Indonesia for a ceremony commemorating the 50th anniversary of the establishment of diplomatic relations between Japan and the Republic of Indonesia.

The prince and princess visited Austria, Bulgaria, Hungary, and Romania in May 2009 on the occasion of "Japan-Danube Friendship Year 2009" and the Netherlands in August 2009 for the commemorative event of the 400th anniversary of the trade relations between Japan and the Netherlands. They have also visited Costa Rica, Uganda, Croatia, the Slovak Republic, Slovenia, Peru, and Argentina.

In addition, Fumihito carried out public duties on behalf of the Emperor when he was hospitalized. He and other members of the imperial family visited the affected areas after the Great East Japan earthquake in March 2011. From June to July 2014, Prince Fumihito and Princess Kiko visited Republic of Zambia and United Republic of Tanzania.

In accordance with legislation passed allowing his father's abdication, he became heir presumptive to the throne on 30 April 2019. Once plans were announced for the impending abdication and his brother's enthronement, Fumihito suggested that instead of using public money the imperial family should pay for the religious rituals in the enthronement as the constitution separates religion and state, despite the government agreeing to foot the bill. In June–July 2019, the Crown Prince and his wife carried out the first official overseas visit by the imperial family following the accession of Emperor Naruhito. They visited Poland and Finland to participate in the celebrations for the 100th anniversary of establishment of diplomatic relationship between Japan and the two countries. In August 2019, the couple and their son, Hisahito, arrived in Bhutan for a visit.

The public proclamation of Fumihito as crown prince did not take place on 19 April 2020 due to the COVID-19 pandemic. His accession as crown prince took place privately. On 8 November 2020, Fumihito was formally declared first in line to the chrysanthemum throne. During the ceremony he said "I will carry out my duties by deeply acknowledging my responsibilities as crown prince".

Titles and honours

Titles and styles
 30 November 1965 – 28 June 1990: His Imperial Highness Prince Aya
 29 June 1990 – 30 April 2019: His Imperial Highness Prince Akishino
 1 May 2019 – present: His Imperial Highness Crown Prince Akishino

Honours

 : Knight Grand Cross of the Order of Merit of the Italian Republic
 : Grand Cross of the Order of Adolphe of Nassau
 : Grand Cross of the Order of the Crown
 : Grand Cross of the Order of the Sun
 : Knight Grand Cross of the Order of Isabella the Catholic
 : Commander Grand Cross of the Order of the Polar Star
 : Grand Cross of the National Order of Merit

Honorary degrees
 Honorary degree (Kasetsart University, 1995)
 Honorary degree (Burapha University, 1995)
 Honorary degree (Khon Kaen University, 1999)
 Honorary degree (Chulalongkorn University, 2001)
 Honorary degree (Srinakharinwirot University, 2001)
 Honorary degree (Ubon Ratchathani University, 2003)
 Honorary degree (King Mongkut's Institute of Technology Ladkrabang, 2007)
 Honorary degree (Chiang Mai University, 2011)
 Honorary degree (Kasetsart University, 2011)
 Honorary degree (Thammasat University, 2012)

References

External links
 
 Their Imperial Highnesses Crown Prince and Crown Princess Akishino and their family at the Imperial Household Agency website

1965 births
Alumni of St John's College, Oxford
Japanese ichthyologists
Japanese ornithologists
Japanese princes
Gakushuin University alumni
Grand Crosses of the Order of the Crown (Netherlands)
Knights Grand Cross of the Order of Isabella the Catholic
Knights Grand Cross of the Order of Merit of the Italian Republic
Grand Crosses of the Order of the Crown (Belgium)
Grand Crosses of the Order of the Sun of Peru
Living people
People from Tokyo
Sons of emperors
Heirs presumptive